"Made in England" is a song by English musician Elton John, released in May 1995 as the title track and second single from his twenty-fourth studio album of the same name (1995). It is an autobiographical telling of his growing up, parts of his life, and what life is like in England. The song peaked at number 18 on the UK Singles Chart and number five on the Canadian RPM Top Singles chart, topping the RPM Adult Contemporary chart for one week. In the United States, the song peaked at number 52 on the Billboard Hot 100 and number 12 on the Billboard Adult Contemporary chart.

Meaning
The song is deliberately made to sound pro-English, but its underlying currents are actually very negative and scolding of some of the English stereotypes, cliches and the shameless paparazzi that he had to deal with during his 40 years in England, notably his court battle with The Sun in 1987 in which they ran a series of false stories about his personal life. The key line at the end wraps up John's sneaky meaning to the song, "But the joke's on you, you never read the song, they all think they know, but they all got it wrong". In addition, the verses exclusively feature American cultural assets such as Cadillac, Little Richard, Georgia (Peach), (boy from) Tupelo, Rock and Roll, (Ford) Cortina or Yankee (summer), which further underlines the satirical context of the song.

Critical reception
Upon its release, the title track received general positive reviews from critics. J.D. Considine from The Baltimore Sun noted its "irrepressible uplift". Chuck Campbell from Knoxville News Sentinel named it a "highlight" of the album, describing it as "a surprisingly catchy up-tempo pop/rock ditty." In his weekly UK chart commentary, James Masterton stated that the second single from the album of same name "in so many ways is a much better single. Forget all these mushy ballads about divorce and middle-age he has been churning out recently, posterity will record that Elton John is the master of the out-and-out pop stormer – and this song, both a homage to this wonderful country and yet at the same time a protest against homophobia is possibly one of the best records he has made for several years." 

Pan-European magazine Music & Media wrote, "In the past the inscription was found on the back of a Matchbox or a Dinky Toy. Elton puts it differently by singing he was made in England like the Cortina. Who cares, all these cars roll. But what's more, the song rocks too!" That aspect also instantly struck Norwegian Radio 102/Haugesund head of music Egil Houeland. He said, "After a whole string of ballads it's interesting to see Elton return with a solid uptempo rocker. He can still do it." A reviewer from People Magazine described it as "a prototypical Elton rocker that should echo nicely off the concrete walls in the stadiums he’ll play in this summer."

Music video
A music video was produced to promote the single, directed by British director Howard Greenhalgh. A "live" performance of the song was filmed in the Ballroom of the British Ambassador's residence in Paris for broadcast on BBC's Top of the Pops. As Elton John couldn't fit a trip to England at the time, the Embassy property was deemed the next best thing.

Personnel
 Elton John – vocals, piano, keyboards
 Guy Babylon – keyboards, programming
 Bob Birch – bass guitar
 Ray Cooper – percussion
 Davey Johnstone – guitars
 Charlie Morgan – drums

Charts

Weekly charts

Year-end charts

Release history

References

1995 singles
1995 songs
Elton John songs
Music videos directed by Howard Greenhalgh
Songs with lyrics by Bernie Taupin
Songs with music by Elton John
The Rocket Record Company singles